Robert Emmet Gribbin (February 21, 1887 - September 23, 1976) was an American prelate of the Episcopal Church, who served as the second of Bishop of Western North Carolina.

Early life and education
Gribbin was born in Windsor, South Carolina, on February 21, 1887, the son of John Gribbin and Rebecca Moore. He studied at The Citadel, and graduated with a Bachelor of Science in 1906.  He then studied at the College of Charleston, and earned a Bachelor of Arts in 1909. Afterwards, he enrolled at the General Theological Seminary, from where he graduated with a Bachelor of Divinity in 1912. He was awarded a Doctor of Sacred Theology from General, and a Doctor of Divinity from the University of the South, both in 1934.

Ordained Ministry
Gribbin  was ordained deacon in 1912 and priest on May 9, 1913, in Grace Church, on both occasions by Bishop William A. Guerry of South Carolina. He served as
assistant minister of Grace Church in Charleston, South Carolina between 1912 and 1915, and then at St Luke's Church in Atlanta, Georgia between 1915 and 1916. In 1916, he became rector of St John's Church in Wilmington, North Carolina, while in 1921, he became rector of St Paul's Church in Winston-Salem, North Carolina, where he remained till 1934.

Bishop
On October 17, 1933, during a special diocesan convention held at St Francis' Church in Rutherfordton, North Carolina, Gribbin was elected as the second Bishop of Western North Carolina on the third ballot. He was consecrated on January 25, 1934, at St Paul's Church in Winston-Salem, North Carolina, by Presiding Bishop James De Wolf Perry. Gribbin retired in 1947.

Family
On June 30, 1915, Gibbin married Emma Manigault Jenkins, and together had three children, including Robert Emmet Gribbin Jr., who was also ordained a priest. Robert E. Gribbin, 3rd, who served as the United States Ambassador to the Central African Republic and then Rwanda, is the son of the Reverend Robert Emmet Gribbin Jr., and grandson of Bishop Gribbin.

References

1887 births
1976 deaths
Episcopal Church in North Carolina
People from Windsor, North Carolina
College of Charleston alumni
General Theological Seminary alumni
20th-century American Episcopalians
Episcopal bishops of Western North Carolina